The International Dialects of English Archive (IDEA) is a free, online archive of primary-source dialect and accent recordings of the English language. The archive was founded by Paul Meier in 1997 at the University of Kansas and includes hundreds of recordings of English speakers throughout the world.

IDEA is divided into 10 major sections: Africa, Asia, Australia-Oceania, Caribbean, Central America, Europe, Middle East, North America, South America and Special Collections, with further divisions by country. Most speakers read a passage of scripted text and also speak some unscripted text, usually containing biographical information about themselves, such as their age, where they were born and where they have lived. This allows the listeners to evaluate the subject's accent or dialect based upon where that subject has spent most of his or her life.

The Special Collections section contains unique information related to accent and dialect studies. For instance, one subsection is devoted to Holocaust survivors while another features readings of "Comma Gets a Cure" (the standard scripted text for most IDEA subjects) by trained speech teachers in the General American dialect. Another part of the Special Collections section is devoted to oral histories and allows subjects to discuss the places in which they grew up and reflect on their heritage. Still another subsection of the Special Collections contains native speakers pronouncing place names, people names and idioms from well-known plays often produced in the theatre. The speakers sometimes add interesting commentary on these words and terms.

The geographical locations of all the subjects featured on the site can be viewed on IDEA's Global Map.
 
The Archive is used primarily by students of accents and dialects, researchers, linguists, actors and those wishing to either study English pronunciation or learn a new dialect or accent. Anyone can submit a sample recording by visiting the "Submit A Sample" page of the Website.

University of Kansas professor and dialect coach Paul Meier, author of Accents & Dialects for Stage and Screen, created IDEA. Since its founding in 1997, the Archive has added approximately 70 associate editors, who are responsible for gathering new primary-source recordings. Senior editors are Eric Armstrong, Geraldine Cook, John Fleming, Bill McCann, and David Nevell. Cameron Meier is executive editor, and Dylan Paul is webmaster and special consultant.

References 

Entsminger, Brandy (November 10, 2008). "KU Theatre Members Sing and Act in the Raunchy Play, Street Scene." University Daily Kansan.

Global English Editors. Global English . Retrieved 2011-07-22.

Gooch, William (March 20, 2009). "Everything Old is New Again." Stage and Cinema.

Meier, Paul (2001). Accents & Dialects for Stage and Screen. Lawrence, Kansas: Paul Meier Dialect Services. .

Meier, Paul (Spring/Summer 1999). "IDEA: An Online Database of Accent and Dialect Resources." VASTA, p. 6.

Parkin, Lin (June 17, 2008). "Got an IDEA of How English Dialects Sound?" Voice Over Times.
 
Roberts, Sam (January 16, 2006). "Mayor's Accent Deserts Boston for New York." The New York Times.

Singh, Anita (January 12, 2009). "Unknown British Actress Set for Holywood Stardom After Becoming New Ally McBeal." The Telegraph.

External links 
 The International Dialects of English Archive
 Vox Daily, International Dialects of English
 Website of Paul Meier, The Research of Paul Meier (IDEA founder/director)

Sound archives in the United States
English language
Dialects of English
English phonology
Online archives of the United States